Malaga is an unincorporated community in northern Malaga Township, Monroe County, Ohio, United States.  Malaga has a ZIP code of 43747 (Jerusalem, as there is no post office in Malaga).  It lies at the intersection of State Routes 145 and 800.

The community was named after Málaga, in Spain.

References

Unincorporated communities in Monroe County, Ohio
Unincorporated communities in Ohio